Harlow is an unincorporated community in Benson County, North Dakota, United States. It is located in Butte Valley Township along North Dakota Highway 30. Harlow is assigned Zip code 58346, which it shares with neighboring Leeds.

History
Harlow was established in 1912 along the Soo Line Railroad. The post office was established in 1914 and was later assigned the zipcode 58340. The post office closed in 1984. The town's population was estimated as high as 100 during its development, but it never incorporated as a city. Alternative suggestions for the origin of the town's name are either after an official with the railroad or after the Harlow Old Fort House in Plymouth, Massachusetts.

The original homesteader was Louis Larsen Ulvestead in 1896. Local resident Ole Ronning (1905-2005), lived on the homestead until moving to Devils Lake in 2000. Ole and his wife, Alma, were known for publishing a comprehensive history of Harlow and the surrounding township in the 1960s.

Geography
Harlow lies along North Dakota Highway 30 between the cities of York and Maddock.

Demographics
Butte Valley Township, in which Harlow is located, showed a population of 87 as of the 2000 Census. As an unincorporated community, the United States Census Bureau does not track total population numbers for Harlow. However, according to census block data, Harlow includes blocks 1275, 1276, and 1282 through 1287 within census tract 9565, block group 1. These blocks had a combined population of 21 during the 2000 Census.

Notable person
Byron Knutson, member of the North Dakota House of Representatives (1959-1962); North Dakota Insurance Commissioner (1977-1980); North Dakota Labor Commissioner (1987-1990)

References

Unincorporated communities in Benson County, North Dakota
Unincorporated communities in North Dakota
Populated places established in 1912
1912 establishments in North Dakota